Cheora Union is a union parishad of Chauddagram Upazila in Comilla district of Bangladesh.

Demographics
According to the 2011 Bangladesh census, Cheora Union had a population of 32,563. This comprised 15,292 males and 17,271 females. Cheora has an average literacy rate of 62.87%.

Administrative structure 
No. 11 Union Parishad is under Chauddagram Upazila of Cheora Union. Administrative activities of this union are under Cheora police station. It is part of Comilla-11, the 259th constituency of the Jatiya Sangsad.Cheora union comprises thirty-nine villages.

Notable residents 
 Kazi Zafar Ahmed-Former Prime Minister of Bangladesh
 Musharraf Hussain (nawab)- politician
 Latifur Rahman- Bangladeshi industrialist

See also
 Upazilas of Bangladesh
 Districts of Bangladesh
 Divisions of Bangladesh

References

External links
 about cheora union

Cumilla District